Quinn is a town in Pennington County, South Dakota, United States. The population was 63 at the 2020 census. The town is the home of the Badlands Observatory, located in the former community hospital, built in 1950.

History
Quinn was laid out in 1907. The town was named for  Michael Quinn, a local rancher. A post office called Quinn has been in operation since 1907.  Quinn Methodist Church is on the National Register of Historic Places.

Geography

Quinn has been assigned the ZIP code 57775 and the FIPS place code 52500.

Climate

Demographics

2010 census
As of the census of 2010, there were 54 people, 23 households, and 14 families living in the town. The racial makeup of the town was 85.2% White, 7.4% Native American, 1.9% Asian, 1.9% from other races, and 3.7% from two or more races. Hispanic or Latino of any race were 1.9% of the population.

There were 23 households, of which 30.4% had children under the age of 18 living with them, 47.8% were married couples living together, 8.7% had a female householder with no husband present, 4.3% had a male householder with no wife present, and 39.1% were non-families. 30.4% of all households were made up of individuals, and 21.7% had someone living alone who was 65 years of age or older. The average household size was 2.35 and the average family size was 3.07.

The median age in the town was 41.5 years. 25.9% of residents were under the age of 18; 5.7% were between the ages of 18 and 24; 24.1% were from 25 to 44; 31.5% were from 45 to 64; and 13% were 65 years of age or older. The gender makeup of the town was 57.4% male and 42.6% female.

2000 census
As of the census of 2000, there were 44 people, 18 households, and 10 families living in the town. The population density was 45.9 people per square mile (17.7/km2). There were 23 housing units at an average density of 24.0 per square mile (9.3/km2). The racial makeup of the town was 93.18% White and 6.82% Native American.

There were 18 households, out of which 44.4% had children under the age of 18 living with them, 61.1% were married couples living together, and 38.9% were non-families. 38.9% of all households were made up of individuals, and 22.2% had someone living alone who was 65 years of age or older. The average household size was 2.44 and the average family size was 3.36.

In the town, the population was spread out, with 34.1% under the age of 18, 29.5% from 25 to 44, 25.0% from 45 to 64, and 11.4% who were 65 years of age or older. The median age was 35 years. For every 100 females, there were 69.2 males. For every 100 females age 18 and over, there were 93.3 males.

The median income for a household in the town was $40,750, and the median income for a family was $41,750. Males had a median income of $28,750 versus $22,500 for females. The per capita income for the town was $13,119. None of the population or families were below the poverty line.

References

Towns in Pennington County, South Dakota
Towns in South Dakota
Rapid City, South Dakota metropolitan area